Rafael Alejandro Dueñas González (born August 1, 1982) is a Mexican football manager and former player.

References

1982 births
Living people
Association football forwards
Mexican footballers
Querétaro F.C. footballers
Liga MX players
Mexican football managers
Footballers from Guadalajara, Jalisco
Salamanca CF UDS managers